The Mid-Atlantic Air Museum (MAAM) is an aviation museum and aircraft restoration facility located at Reading Regional Airport in Reading, Pennsylvania. The museum, founded by Russ Strine, the current President, collects and actively restores historic war planes and classic airliners as well as rare civilian and military aircraft. Many of the museum's historic aircraft are often seen on the airshow circuit.

Overview
The Mid-Atlantic Air Museum has hosted the “World War II Weekend Air Show” annually since 1990. The World War II Weekend is generally scheduled to coincide with 6 June, with an attendance approaching 100,000 people.

The museum offers rides in their vintage North American SNJ (Navy version of the AT-6 “Texan” World War II military trainer) and in a Stearman Biplane on the second Saturday of the month from May through October excluding the month of June.

It has also embarked on an ambitious project to restore its Northrop P-61B Black Widow, recovered from New Guinea in 1989, to flying condition.

Mid Atlantic Air Museum also sells aircraft for MS Flight Simulator of some of their restored aircraft such as the B-25, C-47 and TBM Avenger.

Aircraft on display

 Elias EC-1 Aircoupe
 Brunner-Winkle Bird
 American Eagle Eaglet 31
 Heath LNA-40
 Heath CNA-40 Midwing
 Pietenpol Air Camper
 Kinner B-1
 Kellett KD-1
 Aeronca C-3
 Piper J-2 Cub
 Aeronca K
 Arrow Model F
 Fairchild 24 G
 Taylor-Young Model A
 Troyer VX
 Fairchild PT-19
 Naval Aircraft Factory N3N
 Piper NE-1 Cub
 Stearman N2S-3 Kaydett (B-75N)
 Fairchild PT-26 Cornell
 Vultee BT-13A Valiant
 Cessna UC-78 Bobcat
 North American B-25J Mitchell
 North American SNJ-4B Texan
 Northrop P-61B Black Widow
 Douglas R4D-6 Skytrain
 Eastern Aircraft TBM-3E Avenger
 Auster Mk.V J/1 Autocrat
 Commonwealth 185 Skyranger
 Republic F-84B Thunderjet
 Republic RC-3 Seabee
 ERCO 415-G Ercoupe
 Piper PA-22 Tripacer
 North American F-86F Sabre
 Martin 4-0-4
 Fairchild C-119F Flying Boxcar
 Piasecki H-21B Shawnee
 Piper L-21B Grasshopper
 Vickers 745D Viscount
 Lockheed SP-2H Neptune (P2V-7S)  
 Sikorsky UH-34D Seahorse
 Beechcraft Model G18S
 Piper PA-22-150 Caribbean
 Ried Flying Submarine (Prototype)
 Sikorsky HH-52A Seaguard
 CCW-5 Channelwing
 Rutan VariEze          
 Piper PA-34-200 Seneca
 Spratt 108
 Cessna 150M Commander
 American Aerolites Double Eagle

References

External links

Mid Atlantic Air Museum
World War II Weekend Air Show Information
Mid Atlantic Air Museum Photos of aircraft and other aviation exhibits at the Mid Atlantic Air Museum in Reading, PA

Aerospace museums in Pennsylvania
Museums in Reading, Pennsylvania